Lieutenant James Henry Dewhirst  (born 26 September 1892, date of death unknown) was an English  World War I flying ace credited with seven aerial victories.

Dewhirst initially served in the Royal Naval Air Service before it became part of the Royal Air Force. Between March and November 1918, while serving in No. 45 Squadron, flying a Sopwith Camel, he accounted for seven German aircraft driven down out of control or destroyed.

He later married Emily Chadwick and had two children; Dorothy (b. 1923) and James Ingham (b. 1925).

References

1892 births
Year of death missing
Royal Naval Air Service aviators
British World War I flying aces
Recipients of the Distinguished Flying Cross (United Kingdom)
People from Halifax, West Yorkshire